Donald MacInnis (21 August 1918 – 9 May 2007) was a Progressive Conservative party member of the House of Commons of Canada. He was born in Glace Bay, Nova Scotia and became a coal miner by career.

He was first elected at the Cape Breton South riding in the 1957 general election, defeating the long-serving incumbent Co-operative Commonwealth Federation member of parliament Clarence Gillis, also a former miner. MacInnis defeated Gillis again in a rematch almost a year later in the 1958 general election, known as the "Diefenbaker Sweep." MacInnis remained a Member of Parliament throughout the 1960s and early 1970s except for the 25th Parliament when he was defeated in the riding by Malcolm Vic MacInnis of the New Democratic Party in the 1962 election. Since the 1968 election, MacInnis represented Cape Breton—East Richmond, one of the ridings which replaced the Cape Breton South electoral district in a boundary realignment.

After his term in the 29th Parliament ended in 1974, MacInnis left national office and did not campaign for another term.

From 1988, MacInnis served as the final Mayor of Glace Bay, a municipality which was dissolved in 1995 and replaced by the Cape Breton Regional Municipality.

References

1918 births
2007 deaths
Canadian coal miners
Mayors of places in Nova Scotia
Members of the House of Commons of Canada from Nova Scotia
People from Glace Bay
Progressive Conservative Party of Canada MPs